Lake Strusta is a freshwater lake in the Braslaw District of Vitebsk Region, Belarus, the third largest among the Braslaw Lakes and the sixteenth largest in Belarus.

Lake Strusta is fed by several rivulets running from the Snudy, Balojsa, and Yelno lakes. It is drained by a little river into the Vojsa. The lake has around 22 known species of fish in it, including the European cisco.

The lake covers the area of 13 square km. Its maximum depth is 23 meters. The shores are sandy and marshy, with thick stands of bulrushes. There are numerous little fjords and outlets along the shoreline.

Gallery

References

External links 
 

Strusta
Braslaw District